Radio M is a Bosnian commercial radio station, broadcasting from Sarajevo.

History and programming
As the first independent radio station in ex-Yugoslavia and the wider Balkan region, Radio M is entered in the Register of Public Media in 1990.  Radio began broadcasting on 18 September 1990 and it was formatted as a city music radio station that broadcasts only the greatest music hits.

The station focuses on contemporary pop music, Bosnian music and national news.

Frequencies
The program is currently broadcast on 5 frequencies:

 Sarajevo 
 Banja Luka 
 Tuzla 
 Zenica 
 Bihać

See also 
List of radio stations in Bosnia and Herzegovina

References

External links 
 
 Communications Regulatory Agency of Bosnia and Herzegovina
 Radio M page on Facebook

Sarajevo
Radio stations established in 1990
Mass media in Sarajevo